is a professional Japanese baseball player. He plays pitcher for the Tohoku Rakuten Golden Eagles.

External links

 NPB.com

1994 births
Living people
Baseball people from Osaka Prefecture
Japanese baseball players
Nippon Professional Baseball pitchers
Tohoku Rakuten Golden Eagles players
People from Suita